Athanasios Kostoulas (born 24 March 1976) is a Greek former international football player, who played as a defender.

Club career
Kostoulas stayed for a year at his first professional club, Olympiacos Volos, before moving to Kalamata for the in 1994. The highlight of his five seasons there, which reaped 135 league appearances, was the club's promotion to the Alpha Ethniki in 1995. In July 1999, he joined Olympiacos and ended each of his first three terms with a Greek championship medal. He started the following season on the bench but when handed an opportunity he took it, playing in seven out of the final eight games and excelling in the derby defeat of Panathinaikos which paved the way for another championship success. He remained a consistent performer when used as the title was lost in 2004 and then won back in each of the next two seasons along with the Greek Cup.

In January 2007, he moved to Skoda Xanthi and in summer 2011 to Asteras Tripolis. In the summer of 2013 Kostoulas returned to finish his career in his first professional club, Olympiakos Volos.

International career
Kostoulas was a member of the Greece side reached the 1998 UEFA European Under-21 Championship final, losing 1–0 to Spain. He was then elevated into the senior fold, making his debut in a 4–2 FIFA World Cup qualifying defeat by Germany on 28 March 2001 but has not figured again since a second cap a month later against Croatia.

Honours

Club
Olympiacos
Super League Greece: 1999–2000, 2000–01, 2001–02, 2002–03, 2004–05, 2005–06, 2006–07
Greek Cup: 2004–05, 2005–06

International
Greece
 UEFA Euro U21: Runner-up 1998

References

External links

1976 births
Living people
Association football defenders
Greek footballers
Greece international footballers
Greece under-21 international footballers
Super League Greece players
Olympiacos F.C. players
Xanthi F.C. players
Kalamata F.C. players
Asteras Tripolis F.C. players
Olympiacos Volos F.C. players
Association football utility players
Footballers from Volos